Jayson Richard Hinder (4 September 1965 – 30 April 2017) was an Australian lawyer and politician. He was elected as a Labor Party member of the Australian Capital Territory Legislative Assembly for Ginninderra electorate, in a countback conducted on 3 March 2016 to fill a casual vacancy caused by the resignation of Mary Porter. He was defeated at the general election in October. Hinder was killed in a motorcycle accident in California in April 2017.

Early life
Hinder was born and raised in Canberra, the son of a draughtsman and an art teacher. When his father died of emphysema at the age of 43, Hinder was sent to boarding school in the Southern Highlands while his mother sold the family home and moved into Canberra Girls Grammar School as the school's boarding manager.

Legal career
After leaving school, Hinder worked as a motor mechanic and owned his own business. At the age of 30, he decided to become a lawyer, selling his business and studying law at Australian National University. He was a partner in two Canberra law firms before starting his own practice,  Jayson Hinder & Associates, in 2004.

Sport
Hinder was a member of the ACT Veterans Rugby Club. He received a "Player of the Day Jacket" in 2015 and was also a member of the winning Australian Parliament XV squad in the 2015 Parliamentary Rugby World Cup in England.

References

1965 births
2017 deaths
Australian Labor Party members of the Australian Capital Territory Legislative Assembly
Members of the Australian Capital Territory Legislative Assembly
Australian solicitors
Australian National University alumni
Road incident deaths in California
21st-century Australian politicians
Motorcycle road incident deaths